Harmony of the Seas is an  built by STX France at the Chantiers de l'Atlantique shipyard in Saint-Nazaire, France, for Royal Caribbean International. With a gross tonnage of 226,963 GT, she is the third largest passenger ship in the world, larger than her older sisters Oasis of the Seas and Allure of the Seas, but surpassed by her newer sisters Symphony of the Seas and Wonder of the Seas. In length, however, Harmony of the Seas is the longest cruise ship in the world.

History 

The success of the first two Oasis-class ships led Royal Caribbean Cruises to order a third ship of the type in December 2012. Harmony of the Seas is named after the Harmony module on the International Space Station . The vessel was floated out on 19 June 2015, began her first sea trials on 10 March 2016, and was delivered to Royal Caribbean on 12 May 2016. After a construction time of 32 months, the ship first set sail on 15 May 2016 from the STX France docks in Saint-Nazaire, viewed by some 70,000 people. Her first destination was Southampton, England, although her home port was Barcelona until 23 October 2016 when she crossed the Atlantic.

Harmony of the Seas took two short "preview cruises", three nights to Cherbourg and four nights to Rotterdam, after reaching port in Southampton on 17 May. During these voyages, passengers complained of ongoing construction, a lack of hot water, unopened attractions, excessive waits at restaurants, and other issues. The ship's maiden voyage departed from Southampton on 29 May and arrived at its summer home port of Barcelona on 5 June. According to passengers on this cruise, construction had finished and the ship was ready to sail. For the inaugural season, Harmony of the Seas offered seven-night western Mediterranean cruises originating from Barcelona and Civitavecchia.

On 10 November 2016, the vessel was officially christened by her godmother, Miami-Dade County teacher Brittany Affolter.

Facilities 
Harmony of the Seas has 2,747 staterooms, of various sizes, to accommodate (at double occupancy) 5,479 guests. The ship is divided into seven neighborhoods, including Central Park and Boardwalk, like her Oasis-class sisters. Harmony of the Seas has a number of water-based attractions including a large dry slide complex,  known as The Ultimate Abyss, two surf simulators, three water slides, and 3 swimming pools. It also has the first water slides on a Royal Caribbean ship. She also has 20 dining venues, a 1,400-seat theatre and 11,252 works of art.

Technology 
Harmony of the Seas is 20 percent more energy efficient than her sister ships Oasis of the Seas and Allure of the Seas. Small air bubbles from the keel reduce drag and thus fuel consumption by 7 to 8 percent, and a smooth hull surface further reduces resistance. The bubble system also reduces propeller noise, and is used on Celebrity Reflection and Quantum of the Seas. LED and fluorescent lamps replace incandescent light bulbs, reducing power consumption and the need for air conditioning. The engine system uses a waste heat recovery system, and drives three Azipod propellers.

Incidents 
On 13 September 2016, one employee was killed and four were injured when a lifeboat broke loose and dropped from the fifth deck during a security drill.

On 25 December 2018, British crew member Arron Hough was reported missing by other crew members after failing to report to work. The United States Coast Guard suspended the search for the on-board entertainer on 27 December 2018, after stating that the ship had reported that a crew member had gone overboard.

On 11 January 2019, a 16 year old was trying to enter his eighth-deck cabin through a nearby balcony when he slipped and fell to his death. The accident happened while the ship was docked in Labadee, a leased peninsula in Haiti. The ship's medical team performed cardiopulmonary resuscitation, but the boy had sustained major head trauma and died of his injuries.

On 30 January 2022, Harmony of the Seas entered a temporary exclusion zone around Cape Canaveral, which caused the postponement of a planned launch of a SpaceX Falcon 9 rocket. The rocket was able to successfully launch the following evening. A Coast Guard investigation found Royal Caribbean responsible for the incident, but also led to reforms in how the Coast Guard determines exclusion zones and disseminates that information to ships.

On 26 May 2022, the vessel collided with a jetty in Falmouth, Jamaica. The vessel suffered minimal damage, and was safely docked shortly afterwards. No injuries were reported.

Gallery

References

External links 

 

2015 ships
Ships built in France
Ships of Royal Caribbean International